Gaetano "Tanino" Troja (born July 25, 1944, in Palermo) is a former Italian footballer. He was a forward who played for Palermo, Brescia, Napoli, Bari and Catania. He played seven seasons with Palermo, three in Serie A and four in Serie B, scoring 43 goals and becoming one of the most beloved players in the team history.

External links
Profile at Enciclopedia Del Calcio

1944 births
Living people
Footballers from Palermo
Italian footballers
Palermo F.C. players
Brescia Calcio players
S.S.C. Napoli players
S.S.C. Bari players
Catania S.S.D. players
Association football forwards
Serie A players
Serie B players